Haibei Qilian Airport  is an airport serving Qilian County in Haibei Tibetan Autonomous Prefecture, Qinghai province, China. Construction began in July 2014, with an estimated investment of 1.203 billion yuan. Qilian airport was opened on 28 August 2018. It is the seventh civil airport in Qinghai.

Facilities
The airport has a 3,400-meter runway, a 3,000 square-meter terminal building, and four aircraft parking places.

Airlines and destinations

See also
List of airports in China
List of the busiest airports in China

References

Airports in Qinghai
Airports established in 2018
2018 establishments in China